This is a list of lighthouses in the province of Newfoundland and Labrador in Canada.

References

External links
 

 
Newfoundland and Labrador
Lighthouses